The Callanan Cup was a leading greyhound racing competition held annually at Harold's Cross Stadium in the city district of Harold's Cross, Dublin, Ireland.

It was inaugurated after the Second World War and was used by many leading connections as a warm up competition to the Irish Greyhound Derby.

It was a major competition and was an integral part of the Irish greyhound racing calendar and was set up in memory of Arthur 'Doc' Callanan after he died in October 1945. Callanan was the original veterinary surgeon at the Dublin track when it opened in 1928 and he saved the lives of Mick the Miller in 1928 and Creamery Border in 1932. The race was called the Callanan Memorial Cup from 1970-1981 after which it was discontinued.

Past winners

Venues & Distances
1947-1981	(Harolds Cross 525y)

References

Greyhound racing competitions in Dublin (city)
Recurring sporting events established in 1947
1947 establishments in Ireland